Andreea Ehritt-Vanc and Anastasia Rodionova were the defending champions, but chose not to participate that year.

Maria Kirilenko and Flavia Pennetta won in the final 6–4, 6–4, against Mervana Jugić-Salkić and İpek Şenoğlu.

Seeds

  Maria Kirilenko /  Flavia Pennetta (champions)
  Gabriela Navrátilová /  Monica Niculescu (first round)
  Iveta Benešová /  Petra Cetkovská  (first round)
  Eva Hrdinová /  Klaudia Jans  (second round)

Draw

Draw

External links
Draw

Estoril Open
Portugal Open
Estoril Open